Two Mountains is the English rendering of Deux Montagnes, and can represent

 Two Mountains (electoral district), a former Canadian federal riding containing the municipality of the same name
 Lake of Two Mountains, Lac des Deux Montagnes, lake in the Greater Montreal Area
 Laval—Two Mountains, former Canadian federal riding
 Deux-Montagnes, municipality in southwestern Quebec, Canada, called "Two Mountains" in English, and named after the lake

See also
 Deux Montagnes (disambiguation)